The history wars were a series of disputes between Canadian historians in the 1980s and 1990s that focused on the legacy of Canadian residential schools as well as the role of social history.  Historian Adam Chipnick describes 1998's Who Killed Canadian History? by J. L. Granatstein as "the pinnacle" of these disputes.

References

Historiography of Canada
Residential schools in Canada